Manu'alesagalala Enokati Posala is a Samoan politician and former Cabinet minister. He is a member of the Human Rights Protection Party.

Manu'alesagalala stood unsuccessfully in the 2010 Safata by-election. He was first elected to the Legislative Assembly of Samoa at the 2011 Samoan general election and appointed Minister of Works Transport and Infrastructure. Shortly after being elected he was accused of bribery in an election petition. The petition was later dropped.

At the 2016 election the two member seat of Safata was split into two single seat constituencies, resulting in Manu'alesagalala running against opposition leader and fellow incumbent Palusalue Faʻapo II for Safata West. Both were defeated by Leaana Ronnie Posini.

References

Living people
Members of the Legislative Assembly of Samoa
Public works ministers of Samoa
Human Rights Protection Party politicians
Year of birth missing (living people)